The 22387 / 22388 Black Diamond Express is a Superfast express train of Indian Railways, with effect from 1 July 2013, connecting  with . It has AC chair car, second-class sitting, & general type of coaches. All classes except general class require prior reservation, whereas general coaches can be boarded with a general daily ticket. No pantry car is available in the train. The Tatkal scheme is available in this train.

Major stations through which it passes are Sheorapheuli Junction, Bandel, Durgapur, Andal,  Asansol etc.

It is hauled by a WAP-7 locomotive of Electric Loco Shed, Howrah. It is the twin train of the Coalfield Express, which runs from Dhanbad to Howrah as well. However, it runs through the Howrah–Bardhaman main line while Coalfield Express goes through the Howrah–Bardhaman chord. It is an important train, and runs during the office hours, hence it receives a high priority run.

As such, the train serves as a link between towns such as Bandel, Sheoraphuli, which are located on the main line with industrial centers Durgapur, Asansol, Dhanbad and Bokaro (via Dhanbad) and the metropolis of Kolkata.

Route & Halts

It runs from Howrah via Seoraphuli, Bandel, Barddhaman, Mankar, Panagarh, Durgapur, Waria, Andal, Raniganj, Asansol, Sitarampur, Kulti, Barakar, Kumardubi to Dhanbad.

Locomotive

Both trains are hauled by a Howrah-based WAP-7 locomotive end to end.

Accidents 

On April 20, 2016, 22387 UP train's locomotive broke down shortly after leaving Barddhaman.

References

Rail transport in Howrah
Transport in Dhanbad
Express trains in India
Rail transport in West Bengal
Rail transport in Jharkhand
Railway services introduced in 2013
Named passenger trains of India